Kasun Disi Kithuruwan Vithanage  (born February 1991), or commonly Kithuruwan Vithanage, is a professional Sri Lankan cricketer who plays for all forms of the game in international level. He is a Left-hand batsman and legbreak bowler.

International career
He made his test debut for Sri Lanka on 8 March 2013 Galle against Bangladesh and One day International debut 25 December 2013 at Abu Dhabi against Pakistan. He scored 59 runs on his test debut and 27 runs on ODI debut. He could not continue a good form in ODIS but scored his first test ton against Bangladesh scoring 103 not out. With that test ton, he was only the second Sri Lankan to score a test century when batting at number 8 position in tests and jointly holds the record for the highest test score with Thilan Samaraweera when batting at number 8 position for Sri Lanka. He made his T20I debut against England on May 20, 2014, and scored 38 runs.

After New Zealand tour in Sri Lanka A team, Vithanage showed his talents that he can come in to the Test side back. He was called up for the first Test against New Zealand on 10 December 2015.

Controversies 
Kithruwan Vithanage has been involved in several incidents regarding discipline. In one such instance in 2014, following the end of the third day of the first test match against Pakistan in Galle, he left the team hotel without permission and returned at 6.30 am next morning. According to Sri Lanka team manager Michael de Zoysa, this was not the first time he has breached team discipline. In previous occasions Vithanage had left the hotel without permission during tours of Bangladesh and England. As a result of his actions he was placed on probation for one year.

In July 2016 Sri Lanka Cricket suspended Vithanage from all forms of cricket for one year for his part in a public brawl.

References

External links

1991 births
Sri Lankan cricketers
Sri Lanka One Day International cricketers
Living people
Sri Lanka Test cricketers
Basnahira cricketers
Sri Lanka Twenty20 International cricketers
Colombo Cricket Club cricketers
Tamil Union Cricket and Athletic Club cricketers
Kandurata Warriors cricketers
Sri Lanka Cricket Combined XI cricketers
Asian Games medalists in cricket
Cricketers at the 2014 Asian Games
Galle Guardians cricketers
Asian Games gold medalists for Sri Lanka
Medalists at the 2014 Asian Games